Juan de la Cuesta Hispanic Monographs (Cuesta) is a North American publishing house located in Newark, Delaware. Established in 1978 by Tom Lathrop, Cuesta has published over 400 books dealing with Spanish linguistics and Spanish and Latin American literature from medieval to modern times with a focus on the Spanish Golden Age.

History
Thomas Albert Lathrop founded Cuesta in 1978 in order to provide a publishing outlet for manuscripts dealing with Spanish literary criticism, linguistics, and critical editions of classic literature. Lathrop named the publishing house after Juan de la Cuesta, the Madrid-based printer who most notably printed the first editions of Cervantes's Don Quijote (1605 and 1615). The depiction from the title page of the 1605 printing of Don Quijote of the hooded falcon and water spaniel encircled by the Latin motto "POST TENEBRAS SPERO LUCEM" ("After darkness I hope for light") was adopted by Lathrop as the logo for Cuesta. 

The first book published by Juan de la Cuesta Hispanic Monographs was a collection of fourteen papers presented at the Pomona College Symposium on Cervantes in 1978, called "Cervantes and the Renaissance," edited by Michael McGaha, reviewed in the South Atlantic Review 1982.

Series
Within the monographs, aside from the more general works, specialty areas include:
 Documentacíon cervantina ‹‹Tom Lathrop››: Literary criticism dealing with the works of Cervantes.
 Estudios lingüisticos: Linguistic studies.
 Ediciones críticas: Critical editions of important Spanish and Latin American works.
 Homenajes: Festschrifts in honor of prominent Hispanists.
 Estudios de literatura latinoamericana ‹‹Irving A. Leonard››: Literary criticism dealing with Latin American literature.
 Estudios de literatura medieval ‹‹John E. Keller››: Studies dealing with Medieval Spanish Literature.
 Estudios judeoespañoles ‹‹Samuel G. Armistead y Joseph H. Silverman››: Studies dealing with Judeo-Spanish Literature.
 Estudios de la literature moderna «Russell P. Sebold»: Literary criticism dealing with Modern Spanish Literature.
 Serie de traducciones críticas: Critical translations of classic Hispanic literature.
 UCLA Center for 17th- and 18th-Century Studies: The Comedia in Translation and Performance
 UC Santa Barbara: Catalan Studies

Awards
Numerous Cuesta titles have won literary awards, including:
 "Making Sense of the Senses: Current Approaches in Spanish Comedia Criticism," edited by Yolanda Gamboa and Bonnie Gasior won the Vern Williamsen Comedia Book Prize, awarded once every three years from the AHCT (2020). 
 "Upon the Death of Don Quijote," the first English translation of "Al morir don Quijote" by Andrés Trapiello, translated by Veronica Dean-Thacker won the Fundación José Manuel Lara Award to the Best Book of the Year according to Spanish publishers in 2005, translation published by Cuesta in 2020. 
 "The Sanz Sueltas: A Descriptive, Analytical Catalogue," by Karl C. Gregg won the Premio Nacional de Bibliografía de la Biblioteca Nacional de España in 2004, published by Cuesta in 2012.

Editorial board
Vincent Barletta Stanford University
Annette Grant Cash Georgia State University
Gwen KirkpatrickGeorgetown University 
Mark P. Del Mastro College of Charleston
Juan F. Egea University of Wisconsin-Madison
Sarah L. Lehman Fordham University
Mariselle Meléndez University of Illinois at Urbana-Champaign
Eyda Merediz University of Maryland
Dayle Seidenspinner-Núñez University of Notre Dame
Elzbieta Sklodowska Washington University in St. Louis
Noël ValisYale University

References

External links
 Official site

Book publishing companies of the United States
American companies established in 1978
Companies based in New Castle County, Delaware